Danish Azad Ansari is an Indian politician, social worker, and member of the Uttar Pradesh Legislative Council since 2022. He is a member of the Bhartiya Janata Party.

Early life 

Danish Azad Ansari was born on 30 May 1988 in Ballia, Uttar Pradesh, India.

Education 

Danish Azad Ansari had his early education at Holy Cross School in Ballia, Uttar Pradesh. After completing his primary education, Ansari went to University of Lucknow and did his post-graduation in Quality Management and Public Administration.

Political career 

Danish Azad Ansari joined Akhil Bharatiya Vidyarthi Parishad while studying at University of Lucknow.

In 2022, Danish Azad Ansari was made a minister in the Government of Uttar Pradesh. He is the only Muslim face in the Second Yogi Adityanath ministry in Uttar Pradesh government. Ansari is currently serving as a member of the Uttar Pradesh Legislative Council since 2022.

Posts held

See also 

 Government of Uttar Pradesh
 Second Yogi Adityanath ministry
 Uttar Pradesh Legislative Council
 Uttar Pradesh Council of Ministers

References 

Members of the Uttar Pradesh Legislative Council
Bharatiya Janata Party politicians from Uttar Pradesh
1988 births
Living people
People from Uttar Pradesh
Politicians from Lucknow
Indian politicians
Indian Muslims
Indian political people
University of Lucknow alumni